WISPA may refer to:

 Wireless Internet Service Provider Association
 Women's International Squash Players Association

See also
Wispa, a chocolate bar
Wi Spa controversy, a controversy at Wi Spa in Los Angeles